Katra means caravanserai (roadside inn) in Arabic and Persian.

Katra may also refer to:

Places

Bangladesh
 Katra (Dhaka), caravanserai inns in Bengal
 Bara Katra ("greater katra"), a historical katra in Dhaka
 Chhota Katra ("lesser katra"), a historical katra in Dhaka

India
 Katras, a town in Jharkhand, India
 Katra, Jammu and Kashmir or Vaishno Devi, a small town in Jammu and Kashmir
 Katra, Allahabad, a locality/township in Uttar Pradesh
 Katra, Gonda, a town and a nagar panchayat in Uttar Pradesh
 Katra Gulab Singh, a town and regional market in Uttar Pradesh
 Katra Medniganj, a town and a nagar panchayat in Uttar Pradesh
 Katra, Shahjahanpur, a town and a nagar panchayat in Uttar Pradesh
 Katra Masjid, a mosque and tomb in Murshidabad, West Bengal

Iran
 Katra, Iran, a city in Fars Province, also known by several other names including Korehi
 Katra, Mazandaran, a village in Mazandaran Province
 Katra Rural District, an administrative subdivision of Mazandaran Province

Lithuania
 Katra, Lithuania, a village in Alytus County
 Katra or Kotra, a river along the Belarus–Lithuania border

People
Katra Sambili, Kenyan writer, thinker and poet
Katra Solopuro (born 1984), Finnish vocalist and founder of the band Katra
Katra Zajc (born 1967), Slovenian alpine skier

Other uses
Katra (band), a Finnish symphonic metal band 
Katra (Star Trek), the Vulcan word for a person's soul or spirit
Katra Bazar Assembly constituency, a constituency of the Uttar Pradesh Legislative Assembly in India
Shri Mata Vaishno Devi Katra railway station, on the Jammu Udhampur Srinagar Baramulla Railway Link in India

See also
Catra, a fictional character in the Masters of the Universe franchise
Katradevi, a village in Rajapur taluka in India
Katras, a neighbourhood in Dhanbad City in India
Khatra (disambiguation), various uses